Funen's Art Museum (Danish: Fyns Kunstmuseum), formerly The Museum of Funen's Abbey and Museum Civitatis Othiniensis, founded in 1885, is an art museum in Odense, Denmark. Funen's Art Museum operated as a part of the Odense City Museums (Odense Bys Museer).

History
Fyns Kunstmuseum is housed in a stately neo-classical building  built in 1883–84 with Emil Schwanenflügel (1847-1921) as supervising architect.
The building has a characteristic temple gable and a decorated frieze with scenes from Denmark's history and Norse mythology.

The museum was founded as a mini version of Nationalgalleriets (later the Statens Museum for Kunst) and holds a wide range of works by important Danish artists. The older section contains amongst other things principal works by Jens Juel, Dankvart Dreyer, P.S. Krøyer and H. A. Brendekilde. There are also works by Harald Giersing, Vilhelm Lundstrøm, Olaf Rude og Vilhelm Bjerke Petersen. The museum specializes particularly in concrete and Constructivist art.

References

External links
 Fyns Kunstmuseum website
Odense Bys Museer website

Art museums and galleries in Denmark
Museums in Odense
Art museums established in 1885
1885 establishments in Denmark
Constructivism (art)